Phantasm is a 1979 American science fantasy horror film that was directed, written, photographed, and edited by Don Coscarelli. The first film in the Phantasm franchise, it introduces the Tall Man (Angus Scrimm), a supernatural and malevolent undertaker who turns the dead of Earth into dwarf zombies to be sent to his planet and used as slaves. He is opposed by a young boy, Mike (Michael Baldwin), who tries to convince his older brother Jody (Bill Thornbury) and family friend Reggie (Reggie Bannister) of the threat.

Phantasm was a locally financed independent film; the cast and crew were mostly amateurs and aspiring professionals. Though initial reviews were mixed in regard to the dreamlike, surreal narrative and imagery, later reception was more positive and the film became a cult classic. It has appeared on several critics' lists of best horror films, and it has been cited as an influence on later horror series. It was followed by four sequels: Phantasm II (1988), Phantasm III: Lord of the Dead (1994), Phantasm IV: Oblivion (1998) and Phantasm: Ravager (2016).

Plot
While having sex in Morningside Cemetery, Tommy is stabbed by a woman, who is actually the Tall Man, the Morningside mortician, in another form. At the funeral, Tommy's friends, Jody and Reggie, believe he committed suicide. Jody's 13-year-old brother Mike secretly observes the funeral and sees the Tall Man placing Tommy's heavy casket, seemingly with little or no effort, back into the hearse instead of completing the burial.  Mike then goes to a fortune teller and tells her what he saw.  She has him stick his hand in a box, and at first something seems to grab it, but then he removes it unharmed.

Later, Jody is seduced by the Lady in Lavender and taken to the cemetery to have sex. However, they are interrupted by Mike, who has been following Jody and has been driven out of his hiding place by a short, hooded figure. Mike tries to tell Jody about the hooded figure, but Jody dismisses the story. At the mausoleum, Mike is accosted by a caretaker but escapes. Mike then flees the Tall Man. As Mike slams a door to get away, the Tall Man's fingers get caught and then cut off, but continue to move, dripping yellow ichor. Taking one of the fingers with him, Mike escapes the mausoleum.

The still-moving finger is enough to convince Jody about Mike's stories. Before Jody can bring the finger to the sheriff, it transforms into a flying insect. Reggie, who witnesses the finger-turned-insect attack them, joins the brothers in their suspicions. Jody goes to the cemetery alone but is chased away by dwarves and a seemingly driverless hearse. He is rescued by Mike in Jody's Plymouth Barracuda. Running the hearse off the road, they discover that it was driven by one of the hooded figures, a re-animated and shrunken Tommy, whom they hide in Reggie's ice cream truck.

Reggie and Jody resolve to defeat the Tall Man, while Mike is hidden at an antique store owned by Jody's friends Sally and Sue. There, Mike discovers an old photograph of the Tall Man and insists on being taken home. On the way, Mike, Sally and Sue come across the ice cream truck, overturned. They are attacked by a mob of hooded dwarves. Mike manages to escape, presuming the girls and Reggie dead.

Jody goes to the mausoleum to kill the Tall Man, first locking Mike in his bedroom for safety. Mike escapes, but runs into the Tall Man, who was waiting for him outside his front door. He kidnaps Mike in a hearse, but Mike escapes and causes the hearse to strike a pole and explode. Looking for Jody in the mausoleum, Mike is targeted by the silver sphere until Jody destroys it with a shotgun. Mike and Jody are reunited with Reggie, and together they enter a brightly lit room, which is filled with canisters containing more dwarves. Mike catches a brief glimpse through a portal, seeing a red, hot world where the dwarves are toiling as slaves.

A sudden power outage separates the trio. Left alone in the room, Reggie activates the portal, creating a powerful vacuum from which he narrowly escapes. In the ensuing storm, Reggie is stabbed by the Lady in Lavender while Jody and Mike flee and the mausoleum vanishes. Jody devises a plan to trap the Tall Man in an abandoned mine shaft. The Tall Man attacks Mike at home and chases him outside, where he eventually falls into the mine shaft and is buried under an avalanche of rocks triggered by Jody.

After this, Mike wakes up in his bed, still worried about the Tall Man. Reggie, still alive, tells Mike that he had a nightmare, that Jody died in a car wreck and proposes a road trip. When Mike enters his bedroom to pack, the Tall Man appears and hands crash through the bedroom mirror, pulling Mike inside.

Cast
 Angus Scrimm as The Tall Man:
 After being intimidated by Scrimm on the set of a previous film, Coscarelli decided that Scrimm would make a great villain. Initially, Scrimm had little input into the character, but he made more of a contribution as Coscarelli began to trust his instincts. Scrimm was outfitted in lifts and a suit too small for him in order to make him seem even taller and skinnier.  Coscarelli says of Scrimm, "I really didn't have any idea that he would take it to the level that he did. ... I could see it was going to be a very powerful character."
 A. Michael Baldwin as Mike Pearson:
 Coscarelli attributes the enduring popularity of the film to young audiences who respond to Mike's adventures.  After they worked together in a prior film, Coscarelli wrote a film in which Baldwin could star.
 Bill Thornbury as Jody Pearson:
 Jody is Mike's older brother. After their parents die, Jody becomes Mike's guardian, but Jody confides in his friends that he's uncomfortable with the responsibility.
 Reggie Bannister as Reggie:
 Don Coscarelli based the character of Reggie on his friend Reggie Bannister, for whom the role was written; they then twisted the character into new directions.  Reggie was designed to be an everyman, a loyal friend, and the comic relief.
 Kathy Lester as Lady in Lavender:
The Tall Man appears in the form of the Lady in Lavender, which he uses to seduce and kill Tommy, Jody's friend. Laura Mann appears as Kathy Lester's double, credited as Double Lavender.
 Bill Cone as Tommy
 Mary Ellen Shaw as the fortune-teller
 Terrie Kalbus as the fortune-teller's granddaughter
 Lynn Eastman as Sally

Analysis
Film scholar John Kenneth Muir interprets the film as being about mourning and death. Many of the film's fans are young boys, aged 10–13. According to Angus Scrimm, the film "gives expression to all their insecurities and fears". Scrimm states that the theme of loss and how, by fantasizing about death, the young protagonist deals with the deaths in his family drives the story. Coscarelli identifies it as a "predominately male story" that young teens respond to. Scrimm explains the popularity of the film as fans responding to themes of death, and the Tall Man himself represents death. Muir describes the Tall Man as embodying childhood fears of adults and states that the Tall Man wins in the end because dreams are the only place where death can be defeated. American views of death are another theme:

Dreams and surrealism are also important elements of Phantasm. Marc Savlov of the Austin Chronicle compares Phantasm to the works of Alejandro Jodorowsky and Luis Buñuel in terms of strangeness. Savlov describes the film as existentialist horror and "a truly bizarre mix of outlandish horror, cheapo gore, and psychological mindgames that purposefully blur the line between waking and dreaming." Gina McIntyre of the Los Angeles Times describes the film as surreal, creepy, and idiosyncratic. Muir writes that Phantasm "purposely inhabits the half-understood sphere of dreams" and takes place in the imagination of a disturbed boy.

Production

Development
After seeing the audience reaction to jump scares in Kenny and Company, writer-director Don Coscarelli decided to do a horror film as his next project. His previous films had not performed well, and he heard that horror films were always successful; branching into horror allowed him to combine his childhood love of the genre with better business prospects. The original idea was inspired by Something Wicked This Way Comes by Ray Bradbury. Coscarelli had initially sought to adapt the story into a film, but the license had already been sold. The theme of a young boy's difficulty convincing adults of his fears was influenced by Invaders from Mars (1953). Dario Argento's Suspiria (1977) and its lack of explanations was another influence on Coscarelli. The soundtrack was influenced by Goblin and Mike Oldfield. The synthesizers were so primitive that it was difficult to reproduce the same sound twice. When writing the film's conclusion, Coscarelli intentionally wanted to shock audiences and "send people out of the theater with a bang."

Filming
There were no accountants on the set, but Coscarelli estimates the budget at $300,000. Funding for the film came in part from Coscarelli's father, who was credited as the film's producer; additional funding came from doctors and lawyers. His mother designed some of the special effects, costumes, and make-up. The cast and crew were composed mainly of friends and aspiring professionals. Due to their inexperience, they did not realize that firing blanks could be dangerous; Coscarelli's jacket caught fire from a shotgun blank. Casting was based on previous films that Coscarelli directed, and he created roles for those actors. Because he could not afford to hire an editor or cameraman, Coscarelli did these duties himself.

Filming was done on weekends and sometimes lasted for 20 hours a day over the course of more than a year. Reggie Bannister described the production as "flying by the seat of our pants." The actors would be called to perform their scenes and picked up as soon as they were available. Bannister did many of his own stunts. Though set in Oregon, shooting took place primarily in the San Fernando Valley in Chatsworth, California. The script changed often during production, and Bannister says that he never saw a completed copy of it; instead, they worked scene-by-scene and used improvisation. The script was characterized by Coscarelli as "barely linear". While it contained the basic concepts of the completed film, the script was unfocused and rewritten during filming. The spheres came from one of Coscarelli's nightmares, but the original idea did not involve drilling. Will Greene, an elderly metal-worker, fashioned the iconic spheres, but he never got to see the finished film, as he died before the film was released. The black 1971 Plymouth Barracuda was used because Coscarelli had known someone in high school who drove one; he realized that he could get his hands on one by using it in the film. An ice cream shop on main street was filmed on the outskirts of San Diego County in Julian, California.

Post-production
Post-production took another six to eight months. The first test screening was poorly-received due to the film's length; Coscarelli says that he erred in adding too much character development, which needed to be edited out. Phantasms fractured dream logic was due in part to the extensive editing. During shooting, they did not have a clear idea of the ending. Several endings were filmed, and one of them was re-used in Phantasm IV: Oblivion. Coscarelli attributed the freedom to choose from among these endings to his independent financing.

Release
To solicit outside opinions, Coscarelli paid an audience to watch an early cut of the film. Although Coscarelli called the result "a disaster", he was encouraged by the audience's reactions to the film. The financial success of the film Halloween released the prior year convinced vice-president of marketing at AVCO Embassy Pictures, Robert Rehme, to purchase Phantasm for distribution. The film was released March 28, 1979 in California and Texas.

It was released in Australia under the alternative title The Never Dead, to avoid confusion with the similarly-named 1976 Australian softcore porn film Fantasm.

Home media
MGM released Phantasm on LaserDisc in 1981, and on VHS and DVD in August 1998. Embassy Home Entertainment released it on VHS in 1984, and later reissued it under Nelson Entertainment (after Embassy was sold to Coca-Cola in 1985 and renamed). Anchor Bay Entertainment re-released it on DVD on April 10, 2007.

Restoration
In late 2015, Coscarelli showed a work-in-progress 4K resolution restoration of Phantasm (called Phantasm: Remastered) at the Butt-Numb-A-Thon film festival. It was supervised by Coscarelli at Bad Robot Productions. Bad Robot became involved when director J. J. Abrams, a fan of the series, requested a screening of the film. Coscarelli told him that he did not have a high-quality print, but Abrams volunteered the use of his technicians for a restoration. The completed restoration premiered at SXSW in March 2016. Phantasm: Remastered was released in limited theaters on September 24, 2016, and was released on Blu-ray on December 6, 2016.

Reception

Critical response

Contemporaneous
Charles Champlin of the Los Angeles Times deemed the film "a smooth and terrifically impressive technical achievement, a sort of jeu de spook with all manner of eerie and shocking special effects." In a mostly negative review, critic Roger Ebert described the film as "a labor of love, if not a terrifically skillful one" but admitted Phantasm had a good visual style and sense of pacing. Trevor Johnston of Time Out called the film "a surprisingly shambolic affair whose moments of genuine invention stand out amid the prevailing incompetence." Dave Kehr of the Chicago Reader described it as "spotty" and "effective here and there", though he praised Coscarelli's raw ability. Vincent Canby of The New York Times compared it to a ghost story told by a bright, imaginative 8-year-old; he concluded that it is "thoroughly silly and endearing". Variety gave it a positive review that highlighted the use of both horror and humor. Tim Pulleine (Monthly Film Bulletin) described the film as a "dilapidated z-movie" with "singularly unconvincing apparitions and contraptions" and that the film did not have "anything resembling a coherent plot in the course of all the fumblingly juvenile malarkey".

Retrospective
On the review aggregator website Rotten Tomatoes, Phantasm holds a 72% approval rating based on 47 critic reviews, with an average rating of 6.6/10. The consensus reads: "Phantasm: Remastered adds visual clarity to the first installment in one of horror's most enduring -- and endearingly idiosyncratic -- franchises." Kim Newman of Empire called it "an incoherent but effective horror picture" that "deliberately makes no sense" and rates it four out of five stars. Scott Weinberg of Fearnet stated the acting is "indie-style raw" and special effects are sometimes poor, but the originality and boldness make up for it. Steve Barton of Dread Central gave the film a score of five out of five stars, calling it a masterpiece and "one hell of a scary film". Bloody Disgusting's John Squires rated it four out of five stars, calling it "truly original" and writing that it "imbues in its viewers is a profound sense of dread". Author John Kenneth Muir called the film striking, distinctive, and original. Muir stated that the film has become a classic, and that the Tall Man is a horror film icon.

Box office
Phantasm grossed $15 million in the United States and Canada. In its first 3 months in 10 foreign territories, the film grossed $7 million for a worldwide total of $22 million.

Legacy

The film was rated #25 on the cable channel Bravo!'s list of The 100 Scariest Movie Moments. It is also placed #75 in Time Out London's 100 best horror films. Drive-in movie critic Joe Bob Briggs included it at #20 in his 25 Scariest DVDs Ever list. UGO placed the film (and the Tall Man) at #7 out of 11 in its Top Terrifying Supernatural Moments. Phantasm has become a cult film; Coscarelli attributes its cult following to nostalgia and its lack of answers, as repeated viewings can leave fans with different interpretations.  USA Today described three characteristics that make it a cult film: "the touching portrayal of two brothers in danger, an iconic villain in The Tall Man (Angus Scrimm) and a floating metallic sphere that's a death-dealing weapon."

The name of Star Wars: The Force Awakens villain Captain Phasma was chosen as a reference to Phantasm. Director Abrams said, "Phasma I named because of the amazing chrome design that came from Michael Kaplan's wardrobe team. It reminded me of the ball in Phantasm, and I just thought, Phasma sounds really cool."

USA Today quoted Jovanka Vuckovic, editor-in-chief of Rue Morgue, as stating that Supernatural, A Nightmare on Elm Street (1984), and One Dark Night (1983) were all influenced by Phantasm. Folklore, Horror Stories, and the Slender Man identifies the Tall Man as an influence on the internet-based character Slender Man.

British Dance act S'Express used the main movie's theme in the track Coma II which was the final track on their number 1 debut album Original Soundtrack (1988 on Rhythm King Records)

The song "Left Hand Path" by Swedish death metal band Entombed on their 1990 album of the same name features an interpolation of the Phantasm theme.

The 1997 computer game Blood paid homage to the film in the first level of the first episode (E1M1), titled "Cradle to the Grave". This map takes place in the Morningside Mortuary. In the 1998 sequel, Blood II: The Chosen, there is a weapon called The Orb that emulates the metal spheres in Phantasm by flying into the head of the enemy and drilling out their brain, spraying blood everywhere.

The 2014 song "Headless Ritual" by Army of the Pharaohs, from their album In Death Reborn, was inspired by the flying death ball from the film.

Awards
Don Coscarelli won the Special Jury Award in 1979 at the Avoriaz Fantastic Film Festival, and the film was nominated for the Saturn Award for Best Horror Film in 1980.

References

Works cited

External links

 
 
 
 
 

1979 films
1979 horror films
1970s coming-of-age films
1970s fantasy films
1979 independent films
1970s science fiction horror films
1970s supernatural films
American coming-of-age films
American fantasy films
American independent films
American science fiction horror films
American supernatural horror films
Embassy Pictures films
Films about brothers
Films about death
Films about nightmares
Films about orphans
Films directed by Don Coscarelli
Films set in Oregon
Films shot in Los Angeles
Grave-robbing in film
Phantasm (franchise)
Avalanches in film
American exploitation films
1970s English-language films
1970s American films
Films shot in San Diego